Askold Igorevich Ivantchik (born 2 May 1965) is a Russian historian. Receiving his Ph.D. in history in 1996, Ivantchik was made a Corresponding Member of the Russian Academy of Sciences in 2003 and is Professor of History at Moscow State University. Since 2009 he has been editor-in-chief of the Journal of Ancient History. Ivantchik specializes in the study of the ancient Eurasian steppe nomads such as the Cimmerians and Scythians. From 2017 he is a editor-in-chief of the Ancient Civilizations from Scythia to Siberia and foreign Corresponding Member of the Académie des Inscriptions et Belles-Lettres.

References

1965 births
21st-century Russian historians
Academic journal editors
Corresponding Members of the Russian Academy of Sciences
Moscow State University alumni
Academic staff of Moscow State University
Scythologists
Living people